Cebolla is an unincorporated community in Rio Arriba County, New Mexico. Cebolla has a post office with ZIP code 87518.

History 
Cebolla was settled around 1800 and named after the valley. Sheep that grazed in the valley were fond of eating the wild onions, and shepherds dubbed it El Valle de Cebolla. The Rio Cebolla flows through the village.

References

Unincorporated communities in Rio Arriba County, New Mexico
Unincorporated communities in New Mexico